MFC Prodexim Kherson (ukr. Міні-Футбольний Клуб «Продексім» Херсон), is a futsal club from Kherson, Ukraine, and plays in Ukrainian Men's Futsal Championship.

Honours
 Extra-Liga:
 2016/17, 2017/18, 2018/19, 2019/20
 Ukrainian Cup:
 Quarter-finalist: 2017/18

Season by season

Current squad
''Last Update: 31 January 2021

Squad changes 2020/2021

In 
 Daniel da Rosa from  Braga
 Andrew from  Shriker Osaka

Out 
 Richard Dávid to  Haladás VSE
 Daniel to  Cybertel Aniene C5

References

External links 
  Official web site
  Footballfacts profile
  UEFA profile

Futsal clubs in Ukraine
Sport in Kherson
Futsal clubs established in 2006
2006 establishments in Ukraine